The Tambroni Cabinet was the 15th cabinet of the Italian Republic led by the Christian Democrat Fernando Tambroni. It lasted from 25 March to 26 July 1960. The government received the necessary vote of confidence from the parliament thanks to the support of the neo-fascist Italian Social Movement (MSI), a unique case in the history of the Italian Republic. Tambroni's brief government was heavily criticized by the Italian left.

Tambroni's role as Prime Minister is best remembered for the short-lived riots that occurred in the summer of the same year due to his support for the MSI; as a consequence, Tambroni was eventually replaced by the Christian Democrat politician Amintore Fanfani as Prime Minister of Italy.

History
Prime Minister Fernando Tambroni was a prominent advocate of law and order policies. He is mostly remembered for his resignation caused by the Genoa riots of 1960.

Ferruccio Parri held an anti-fascist talk in during a demonstration on 19 July, two days after Tambroni's resignation.

Its Minister of Culture Umberto Tupini attacked Federico Fellini's La Dolce Vita, announcing that all the "shameful films" would soon be banned.

The 1960 Summer Olympics were to be held in Rome from 25 August. Italy had been admitted to the United Nations in December 1955, and in 1960, international public opinion was still aware of the shadow of Italy's fascist past. Historian Gianpasquale Santomassimo said that if the games had been held under a government of fascists and filo-fascists, it would have been a catastrophic impact on Italy's image.

Composition

References

Sources

External links
Il Governo Tambroni - minister list on the Official website of the Italian government
Alessandra Fava In migliaia a Genova per ricordare la rivolta antifascista

Italian governments
1960 establishments in Italy
1960 disestablishments in Italy
Cabinets established in 1960
Cabinets disestablished in 1960